General Sir Eric Carden Robert Mansergh,  (12 May 1900 – 8 November 1970) was a senior British Army officer during and after the Second World War.

Military career
Robert Mansergh was born in Cape Colony and educated at the Rondebosch Boys' High School in Cape Town and the Royal Military Academy, Woolwich. He was commissioned into the Royal Field Artillery in 1920. He served with the British Military Mission to Iraq between 1931 and 1935, being awarded the Military Cross in 1932.

During the Second World War, Mansergh served with the Royal Artillery in Eritrea, Abyssinia, the Western Desert of Libya, the Middle East, Persia, Iraq, Arakan, Assam and Burma. Having been promoted acting major general in 1944, he commanding the 11th (East Africa) Division and the 5th Indian Infantry Division.

Promoted acting lieutenant general in 1946, Mansergh commanded the XV Indian Corps and was then appointed Commander-in-Chief of Allied Forces in the Netherlands East Indies. Mansergh later served as Military Secretary from 1948 to 1949, Commander of British Forces in Hong Kong from 1949 to 1951, Deputy Commander-in-Chief of Allied Forces Northern Europe from 1951 to 1953, Commander-in Chief of Allied Forces Northern Europe from 1953 to 1956 and Commander-in-Chief of the United Kingdom Land Forces from 1956 to 1959. In that capacity he headed a Committee which looked at the Administration of the British Army.

Mansergh also served as Colonel Commandant of the Royal Artillery and the Royal Horse Artillery Regiments.

References

Bibliography

External links
Historical records from The National Archives (United Kingdom)
Generals of World War II

 

|-

|-

|-

1900 births
1970 deaths
British Army generals
British Army generals of World War II
Graduates of the Royal Military Academy, Woolwich
Knights Grand Cross of the Order of the Bath
Knights Commander of the Order of the British Empire
Recipients of the Military Cross
Alumni of Rondebosch Boys' High School
Royal Field Artillery officers